The 2009–10 San Jose Sharks season was the team's 19th season of operation in the National Hockey League (NHL).

Off-season 
At the 2010 NHL Entry Draft, the Sharks picked William Wrenn in the second round with their first choice. The Sharks had traded their first-round pick to the Tampa Bay Lightning as part of the trade to acquire defenseman Dan Boyle.

Forward Patrick Marleau was replaced as team captain by defenseman Rob Blake.

Season events

Pre-season

Standings

Divisional standings

Conference standings

Schedule and results

Green background indicates win (2 points).
Red background indicates regulation loss (0 points).
White background indicates overtime/shootout loss (1 point).

Playoffs

Player statistics

Skaters
Note: GP = Games played; G = Goals; A = Assists; Pts = Points; +/− = Plus/minus; PIM = Penalty minutes
Updated September 18, 2010.

Goaltenders
Note: GP = Games played; TOI = Time on ice (minutes); W = Wins; L = Losses; OT = Overtime losses; GA = Goals against; GAA= Goals against average; SA= Shots against; SV= Saves; Sv% = Save percentage; SO= Shutouts

†Denotes player spent time with another team before joining Sharks. Stats reflect time with the Sharks only.
‡Traded mid-season
Bold/italics denotes franchise record

Awards and records

Awards

Records

Milestones

Transactions 

The Sharks have been involved in the following transactions during the 2009–10 season.

Trades

Free agents acquired

Free agents lost

Claimed via waivers

Lost via waivers

Lost via retirement

Players re-signed

Draft picks 

San Jose's picks at the 2009 NHL Entry Draft in Montreal.

Farm teams 
The Sharks' affiliate in the American Hockey League is the Worcester Sharks.

References 

San Jose Sharks seasons
San Jose Sharks season, 2009-10
San Jose
San Jose Sharks
San Jose Sharks